Spectrum is an instrumental album released by guitarist Steve Howe in 2005.

Howe's band includes his sons Dylan on drums and Virgil on Moog synthesizer; as well as Tony Levin on bass guitar and Oliver Wakeman on organ, synthesizer and piano. The album features guitar-based instrumentals, showing many different genres that influenced Howe.

Track listings
All tracks composed by Steve Howe.

"Tigers Den" (3:46)
"Labyrinth" (3:57)
"Band of Light" (3:34)
"Ultra Definition" (3:39)
"Raga of Our Time" (4:12)
"Ebb and Flow" (4:03)
"Realm Thirteen" (4:27)
"Without Doubt" (3:45)
"Highly Strung" (4:30)
"Hour of Need" (5:13)
"Fool's Gold" (4:05)
"Where Words Fail" (4:16)
"In the Skyway" (3:13)
"Livelihood" (3:34)
"Free Rein" (3:52)

Personnel
Steve Howe - guitars, bass on (2, 4, 5, 6, 8, 9, 11, 14), keyboards on (8), percussions
Oliver Wakeman - organ on (1, 2, 4) synthesizer on (2), piano on (1, 2, 4, 14)
Virgil Howe - Moog synthesizer on (6, 9)
Tony Levin - bass on (1, 3, 7, 10, 12, 13, 15)
Dylan Howe - drums

References

 Personnel : https://www.discogs.com/fr/Steve-Howe-Spectrum/release/1924812

Steve Howe (musician) albums
2005 albums
Inside Out Music albums